Roy Eric Peterson, OC (14 September 1936 – 30 September 2013) was a Canadian editorial cartoonist who drew for The Vancouver Sun from 1962 to 2009.

Biography 
Peterson was born in Winnipeg and studied in Vancouver at the Kitsilano Secondary School and the Vancouver School of Art. Along with the Sun, his work often appeared in Maclean's magazine, where he would illustrate the columns of Allan Fotheringham. He has also illustrated the covers of many of Fotheringham's books.

The Vancouver Sun laid off Peterson in 2009.

Peterson died in West Vancouver, British Columbia, Canada, on 30 September 2013, aged 77, of complications from Parkinson's disease.  He was survived by five children and nine grandchildren.  His longtime wife, Margaret, had predeceased him in 2004.

Awards 
In 2004 he was made an Officer of the Order of Canada and Peterson won seven National Newspaper Awards for his work, the most in the history of the awards.

Bibliography 
 The World According to Roy Peterson, containing selected cartoons from the 1970s, with commentary by Alan Fotheringham
 Drawn and Quartered, containing cartoons drawn during the administration of Pierre Elliott Trudeau, with commentary by Peter C. Newman
 Peterson's ABCs a children's book about the alphabet, with a Canadian focus
 Frog Fables and Beaver Tales (1973) — collaboration with Stanley Burke
 The Day of the Glorious Revolution (1974) — collaboration with Stanley Burke

References

External links 
Records of Roy Peterson are held by Simon Fraser University's Special Collections and Rare Books

1936 births
2013 deaths
Canadian editorial cartoonists
Officers of the Order of Canada
Artists from Winnipeg
Emily Carr University of Art and Design alumni
Deaths from Parkinson's disease
Neurological disease deaths in British Columbia
Vancouver Sun people